Los Hermanos Ayala was an American conjunto group from South Texas. Sons to Pedro Ayala El Monarca del Accordion, Los Hermanos Ayala consisted of Pedro Ayala Jr., Ramon Ayala, and Emilio Ayala.

References

External links
 The Arhoolie Foundation 1
 The Arhoolie Foundation 2
 The Arhoolie Foundation 3

American folk musical groups
Musical groups from Texas